Roger Hegi (born 28 February 1956) is a retired Swiss football midfielder and later manager.

References

1956 births
Living people
Swiss men's footballers
FC Aarau players
FC Luzern players
FC St. Gallen players
Association football midfielders
Swiss Super League players
Swiss football managers
FC St. Gallen managers
Grasshopper Club Zürich managers